The 3rd Lithuanian Vanguard Regiment was a military unit of the Grand Duchy of Lithuania. The full name was 3rd Advance Guard Regiment Field Hetman of Lithuania Antoni Chlewinkiego.

History

Origins 
Formed in 1776.

Great Sejm 1788-1792 
The regiment was stationed in Mazyr & Loyew (1789), Mazyr (1790), Strzeszyn (1791), Vilkaviškis (Oct 1792).

War in Defence of the Constitution 

Kościuszko Uprising
The unit partook in the battles of Krupczyce, Brzesc, Maciejowice, Praga.

Uniforms 
In the Polish Army Museum, there is a yellow metal plume-holder from 1776–89, which is enamelled with the king's cypher (turquoise), a crown (blue and gold), wreath (blue with red ribbons) and metal feathers (turquoise and red). The officers had blue konfederatkas, which were adorned with white cockades and plumes, whereas the towarzycz had blue belts. On their left shoulders, the troopers had blue shoulder straps.

Commanders 
Pułkowniks of the regiment:

 Kazimierz Romanowski (1785), 
 gen. mjr. Antoni Chlewiński (1791-?),
 Piruski.

References 

Military units and formations established in 1776
Cavalry regiments of Lithuania